Sir Reginald Sydney Murley  (2 August 1916 – 2 October 1997) was a British surgeon who was President of the Royal College of Surgeons.

Reginald Murley was a breast cancer biological predeterminist, alongside Maurice Black and Neil McKinnon in the 1950s—recognizing that breast cancer is a systemic (not local) disease at the outset. Also a pioneer of breast conservation (vs radical mastectomy) in Britain, contemporary of George Crile Jr. [reference: ‘The Breast Cancer Wars’, Barron H Lerner MD, 2001].

References 

1916 births
1997 deaths
British surgeons
Knights Commander of the Order of the British Empire
Fellows of the Royal College of Surgeons
20th-century British medical doctors
20th-century surgeons